This article is about the particular significance of the year 1988 to Wales and its people.

Incumbents

Secretary of State for Wales – Peter Walker
Archbishop of Wales – George Noakes, Bishop of St David's
Archdruid of the National Eisteddfod of Wales – Emrys Deudraeth

Events
14 February - Lynette White is murdered in her Cardiff flat.  The case remains controversial for over 20 years, with Jeffrey Gafoor eventually being convicted in 2003.
26 March - The Welsh Ornithological Society is founded at Aberystwyth.
October - County Hall, Cardiff, officially opened as the headquarters of South Glamorgan County Council beside the disused Bute East Dock in the Atlantic Wharf area of Butetown, Cardiff.
4 November - British Rail operates the last steam locomotives in its ownership (and its last narrow gauge trains) on the Vale of Rheidol Railway in regular service prior to its privatisation next year (Santa Specials run on 18 December).
date unknown - The complete Bible translation into Welsh that has been in use since 1620 is replaced with a new version, Y Beibl Cymraeg Newydd (BCN), translated directly from the original languages.

Arts and literature
January - BAFTA Cymru is founded.
28–31 May - First Hay Festival of literature held in Hay-on-Wye.
The Gregynog festival is re-launched by Anthony Rolfe Johnson.
The European Centre for Traditional and Regional Cultures opens in Llangollen.
Independent record label Ankst is formed at the University of Wales, Aberystwyth by Alun Llwyd, Gruffudd Jones and Emyr Glyn Williams.
This year also sees the foundation of:
Ffilm Cymru (Film Foundation for Wales)
New Welsh Review

Awards
National Eisteddfod of Wales (held in Newport)
National Eisteddfod of Wales: Chair - Elwyn Edwards, "Storm"
National Eisteddfod of Wales: Crown - T. James Jones, "Ffin"
National Eisteddfod of Wales: Prose Medal - withheld

New books

English language
Tony Conran - Blodeuwedd
Hilary Llywelyn-Williams - The Tree Calendar
Sheenagh Pugh - Beware Falling Tortoises
Oliver Reynolds - The Player Queen's Wife
Bernice Rubens - Our Father
Glanmor Williams - Recovery, Reorientation and Reformation

Welsh language
Idris Foster, Rachel Bromwich & D. Simon Evans (eds.), Culhwch ac Olwen
Bobi Jones - Llenyddiaeth Gymraeg 1902-36
Rhiannon Davies Jones - Cribau Eryri
Manon Rhys - Cwtsho
Wiliam Owen Roberts - Y Pla
Huw Walters - Canu'r Pwll a'r Pulpud

Music
Ffa Coffi Pawb - Dalec Peilon
Trebor Edwards - Goreuon Trebor
Bonnie Tyler - Hide Your Heart

Film
Peter Greenaway directs Drowning by Numbers.

Welsh-language films
Stormydd Awst

Broadcasting

Welsh-language television
Pobol y Cwm becomes the first European soap opera to be broadcast daily.
C'mon Midffild (drama)

English-language television
The Divided Kingdom (HTV/Channel 4)

Sport
Association football
April – Newport County A.F.C., one of four Welsh teams in the English Football League, are relegated to the GM Vauxhall Conference.
Athletics
Steve Jones becomes the first British competitor to win the New York Marathon.
BBC Wales Sports Personality of the Year – Colin Jackson
Rugby union
Wales top the 1988 Five Nations Championship winning the Triple Crown.
18 May to 11 June – Wales tour New Zealand, losing heavily in both Tests to the All Blacks.
Snooker 
2 May – Terry Griffiths is defeated in the final of the 1988 World Snooker Championship by Steve Davis.
27 November – Doug Mountjoy defeats Stephen Hendry in the final of the UK Snooker Championship to claim his second UK title.

Births
29 January - Catrin Stewart, actress
14 February - Jamie Jones, snooker player
18 February - Mark Davies, footballer
29 February - Hannah Mills, sports sailor
24 March - Curtis McDonald, footballer
11 April - Nathan Stephens, athlete and Paralympian
20 June - Shefali Chowdhury, actress
24 August - Kelly Lee Owens, electronic musician
5 October - Sam Warburton, rugby player
15 November - Daniel Evans, rugby player
13 December - Darcy Blake, footballer
22 December - Leigh Halfpenny, rugby player
28 December 
Ched Evans, footballer
Elfyn Evans, rally driver
31 December - Holly Holyoake, singer

Deaths
January - George Ewart Evans, folklorist and oral historian, 78
26 January - Raymond Williams, writer, 66
2 April - Euros Bowen, poet, 83
April - T. Glynne Davies, poet, novelist and broadcaster, 62
13 May - Elfed Evans, footballer, 61
18 May - Brandon Rhys-Williams, politician, 60
15 June - David Blackmore, cricketer, 88
8 September - Mel Rosser, dual-code international rugby player, 87
23 September - Arwel Hughes, composer and conductor, 79
12 October - Ruth Manning-Sanders, poet and children's author, 102
16 October - John Gwilym Jones, dramatist, 84
11 November - William Ifor Jones, conductor and organist, 88
1 December - Alun Oldfield-Davies, controller of BBC Wales, 83
13 December - Brynmor John, politician, 54
25 December - W. F. Grimes, archaeologist, 83
27 December - Tecwyn Roberts, aerospace engineer, 63 
date unknown
John Morgan, journalist
Ray Price, rugby player, 64 (brain haemorrhage)

References

 
Wales